Flight 164 may refer to:

Aer Lingus Flight 164, hijacked on 2 May 1981
Centurion Air Cargo Flight 164, crashed on 7 July 2008

0164